The Henry and Elizabeth Adkinson Evans House is a historic residence located south of Winterset, Iowa, United States.  Henry Evans settled in the Madison County with his mother when he was 14.  He farmed  of her land and then inherited  when she died in 1875. He opened a quarry, cut the stone, and built this house in 1885.  It was the last house that was built of quarried native limestone constructed by local builders.  The house is a square, two-story structure that is composed of ashlar stone, and capped with a hip roof.  It was listed on the National Register of Historic Places in 1987.

References

Houses completed in 1885
Vernacular architecture in Iowa
Houses in Madison County, Iowa
National Register of Historic Places in Madison County, Iowa
Houses on the National Register of Historic Places in Iowa